Merie Earle (born Goldie Merie Ireland; May 13, 1889 – November 4, 1984) was an American actress. She was best known for playing Maude Gormley on the television series The Waltons (1972–1979).

Early years
Born Goldie Merie Ireland in Morrow, Ohio, Merie Earle grew up in the Columbus area where she enjoyed singing and dancing as a child. Following her marriage she moved to New York City with her husband, who was an engineer for the New York Central. Upon her husband's retirement, the couple relocated to La Crescenta, California, to be closer to their daughter. She was discovered by an agent while performing in a play at a Methodist church.

Career 
Beginning her professional career late in life, Earle's first jobs included ads for Polaroid.

In 1967 she made her feature film debut in Fitzwilly starring Dick Van Dyke. Her screen credits included Gaily, Gaily (1969); In Name Only; Dr. Max (1974); Crazy Mama (1975); Fatso (1980); and Going Ape (1981). She was a regular on the TV series The Jerry Reed When You're Hot You're Hot Hour in 1972 and The Waltons from 1972 to 1979 as Maude Gormley. Earle also appeared in the made-for-TV movie The Last of the Good Guys in 1978.

Scheduled to make her Broadway debut, at age 88, in a revival of Paul Zindel's Effects of Gamma Rays on Man-in-the-Moon Marigolds in 1978, Earle suffered a fractured hip during the show's initial run in La Jolla, California and withdrew from the production prior to its New York premiere. She guest starred on many notable television series including Petticoat Junction, Green Acres, The Beverly Hillbillies, Bewitched, Night Gallery, The Bob Newhart Show, All in the Family, Alice, Phyllis and Whiz Kids.

In her eighties and nineties, she was a frequent guest on The Tonight Show Starring Johnny Carson.

Death
Earle died aged 95 on November 4, 1984, in Verdugo Hills Hospital in Glendale, California, of uremia poisoning following surgery for colon cancer, having outlived both her husband and her daughter.

She was interred at Green Lawn Cemetery in her home town of Columbus, Ohio.

Filmography

Film
Fitzwilly (1967) - Elderly Shoplifter (uncredited)
Gaily, Gaily (1969) - Granny
Norwood (1970) - Grandma Whichcoat
Clay Pigeon (1971)
Summer School Teachers (1975) - Ethel
Crazy Mama (1975) - Bertha
Almost Summer (1978)
Fatso (1980) - Mrs. Maluch
Going Ape! (1981) - Binocular Lady
Likely Stories, Vol. 3 (1983) - Miss Greg (final film role)

Television

Petticoat Junction (1967, Season 5, Episode 1: "Is This My Daughter") - Martha Hughes
Green Acres (1966–1970) - Sarah Hotchkiss Trendell / Sarah Hotchkiss / Old Lady
The Beverly Hillbillies (1968) - Rebecca's Mother
In Name Only (1969, TV Movie) - Granny
Bonanza (1969) - Saloon Woman (uncredited)
Bewitched (1970) - Old Lady
Love, American Style (1970) - Grace (segment "Love and Grandma") (uncredited)
Night Gallery (1970) - Old Woman (segment "The Housekeeper") (uncredited)
The Jerry Reed When You’re Hot You’re Hot Hour (1972)
The Waltons (1972–1979) - Maude Gormley
Apple's Way (1974) - Meg
The Bob Newhart Show (1974–1975) - Mrs. Loomis
ABC After School Specials (1976) - Old Lady
Phyllis (1977) - Wilma
All In The Family (1977) - Florence Talley
Mad Bull (1977, TV Movie) - (uncredited)
C.P.O. Sharkey (1977–1978)
Quincy, M.E. (1978) - Mrs. Foster
Last of the Good Guys (1978, TV Movie) - Fannoy
Stockard Channing in Just Friends (1979) - Elderly Woman
240-Robert (1979) - Sissie
Valentine (1979, TV Movie) - Birdie
WKRP in Cincinnati (1980) - Mrs. Butterworth
Happy Days (1980) - Mrs. Frick - Teacher
Laverne & Shirley (1981) - Lady #1
CBS Children’s Mystery Theater (1981) - Miss Birdie
The Love Boat (1981) - Mrs. Smithers
The Powers of Matthew Star (1982) - Grandma
Small & Frye (1983) - Sister Rita
Alice (1983) - Grandma Sharples
Whiz Kids (1983) - Alma Harrison

References

Bibliography

External links
 
 

1889 births
1984 deaths
American film actresses
American television actresses
20th-century American actresses
Actresses from Ohio
People from Morrow, Ohio
Burials at Green Lawn Cemetery (Columbus, Ohio)